Glossocardia is a genus of flowering plants in the daisy family. It is native to Asia and Australia.

These are perennial herbs with large caudices and toothed ray florets.

 Species
 Glossocardia alorensis Veldkamp & Kreffer - Lesser Sunda Islands
 Glossocardia bidens (Retz.) Veldkamp - Asia; Australia
 Glossocardia bosvallia (L.f.) DC. - India
 Glossocardia calva (Sch.Bip. ex Miq.) Veldkamp	- insular Southeast Asia
 Glossocardia condorensis (Gagnep.) Veldkamp - Vietnam
 Glossocardia integrifolia (Gagnep.) Veldkamp - Laos
 Glossocardia josephinae Veldkamp & Kreffer - Lesser Sunda Islands
 Glossocardia leschenaultii (Cass.) Veldkamp - Java
 Glossocardia orthochaeta (F.Muell.) Veldkamp - Queensland
 Glossocardia refracta Veldkamp - Queensland
 Glossocardia smithii (Backer) Veldkamp	- Java
 Glossocardia tridentata (Turcz.) Veldkamp - Philippines

References

Asteraceae genera
Coreopsideae